The Grand Forever is a complex of twin residential skyscrapers located in West District, Taichung, Taiwan. The buildings were completed in 2016. As of January 2021, it is 30th tallest building in Taichung. The building was constructed under strict requirements of preventing damage caused by earthquakes and typhoons common in Taiwan.

See also 
 List of tallest buildings in Taiwan
 List of tallest buildings in Taichung
 Fubon Sky Tree

References

2016 establishments in Taiwan
Residential skyscrapers in Taiwan
Skyscrapers in Taichung
Apartment buildings in Taiwan
Residential buildings completed in 2016
Twin towers